Hongshan station may refer to:

 Hongshan station (Luoyang Subway), a station on Line 1 of the Luoyang Subway in Luoyang, China.
 Hongshan station (Shenzhen Metro), a station on the Shenzhen Metro in Shenzhen, China

See also
 Redhill railway station, a National Rail station on Brighton Main Line in Redhill, Surrey, England.